Big Brother 2 ran for 92 days, starting on March 14, 2008, and ending on June 14, 2008. The host of the show was Nina Osenar. The prize was 92,000 Euro. This season the Big brother house was divided into two sides the rich side and the poor side. There were thirteen housemates who entered the house on day one and four who entered at later dates. As an added twist this season two of the contestants (Tamara and Tjasa) were related. Also, Mateja who entered the house in week six was the girlfriend of housemate EITyeb. The winner of this season was Naske Mehić.

Housemates

First Batch
The following housemates entered the house on Day 1.

Dada
Dada Perić is a 24-year-old from Koper, Slovenia. During her stay in the Big brother house Dada was never on the poor side of the house following the division of the house. Though she survived the first eviction Dada was not very well received by the public and was voted out with an overwhelming 67 percent of the vote when nominated against Sandi and Tjaša in the third eviction.

Tamara
Tamara Slaček is a 26-year-old from Malečnik, Maribor. During her stay in the house Tamara was seen as a creator of conflict amongst herself and her fellow housemates. She was nominated along with her sister and several other housemates during the first round of nominations and was evicted after receiving over 50 percent of the vote.

Sara
Sara is a 19-year-old from Ljubljana, Slovenia. During her stay in the Big brother house Sara was the only original female who managed to avoid being nominated early on in the show however towards the end of the show Sara was nominated four times and on her fourth time when she was nominated against Marcelo and Sandi, Sara received just over 50 percent of the vote and became the eleventh and final evictee of the season. Sara spent more time in the Big brother Slovenia house than any other female housemate in both seasons (84 days).

Sandi
Sandi Medle is a 22-year-old from Sela pri Ratežu, Slovenia. During his stay in the Big brother house Sandi started a relationship with Tjaša. Early on in the game Sandi found both himself and Tjaša up for nominations several times until in round five of nominations he found himself and Tjaša nominated against only each other (due to the ejection of Dejan). Following Tjašas eviction Sandi seemed to become the comedian of the house. Sandi was nominated a record breaking seven times and rarely came close to being evicted. While considered a favorite to win early on Sandi only managed to become the Runner up of Big brother Slovenia 2, losing to Naske.

Jeanine
Jeanine Čoh is a 21-year-old from Male Braslovče, Slovenia. Early on in her stay in the Big brother house Jeanine was nominated several times, first for what she did not know was a fake eviction which she survived and then she was nominated two more times soon after that. She survived her first two real evictions and for a little while managed to avoid being nominated, but in the eighth round of nominations she was nominated against newcomer Mateja and was evicted with 61 percent of the vote.

Marcelo
Marcelo Knez is a 26-year-old from Vrh pri Boštanju, Slovenia. While in the house Marcelo was rarely nominated for eviction and on the rare occasions when he was nominated he survived. Marcelo ultimately finished in fourth place.

Marko
Marko is a 29-year-old from Ljubljana, Slovenia. Early on his stay in the Big brother house Marko was nominated for what he did not know was a fake eviction. He was fake evicted and moved to the rich side of the house, after he was moved to the rich side of the house he was asked to choose six housemates he would like to have moved to the rich side with him, he chose Dada, EITyeb, Jeanine, Marcelo, Sara and Sandi to join him on the rich side. Marko managed to avoid being nominated until the fourth round of nominations when he was nominated against Jeanine and Tjaša. He was evicted with half of the public's vote making him the first male evictee of the season.

Damjana
Damjana Zupan is a 35-year-old from Dramlje, Slovenia. During her stay in the Big brother house Damjana was nominated in both the first and second round of nominations. Even though she was not poorly received by public when put up against the early favorite to win Sandi in the second round of nominations, Damjana was narrowly evicted with just 52 percent of the publics vote.

Sebastijan
Sebastijan Lazar is a 35-year-old from Novo Mesto, Slovenia. During his stay in the house Sebastijan was rarely nominated. He was finally nominated in the sixth round of nominations. Though it seemed like Sebastijan would survive the sixth eviction, the viewers never got to find out if he would because on day 44 Sebastijan voluntarily left the Big brother house because he was missing his family.

Naske
Naske Mehić is a 23-year-old from Sevnica, Slovenia. Early on in his stay in the Big brother house Naske was one of six of the original 13 housemates chosen to live on the poor side of the house. While almost everyone else in his group was either evicted early or left on their own accord Naske managed to avoid being nominated for most of the game. Naske was finally nominated in round six of nominations and survived. He was nominated again in round ten of nominations and again survived. While Naske was not an initial favorite to win as the season went on he became more and more popular with the viewers and eventually went on to win Big brother 2 Slovenia.

Dejan
Dejan is a 25-year-old from Koper, Slovenia. While in the Big brother house Dejan was only nominated once but the two people he was nominated against (Tjaša and Sandi) had both survived multiple evictions already. On day 38 Dejan was ejected after getting into a fight with Tjaša and slapping her and showing threatening behavior towards her.

Tjaša
Tjaša Slaček is a 19-year-old from Malečnik, Maribor. Tjaša entered on day one with her sister Tamara. Both she and her sister found themselves nominated in the first round of nominations and her sister Tamara was evicted. Following Tamaras eviction Tjaša grew much closer to fellow housemate Sandi. Tjaša was nominated again in the third, fourth, and fifth round of nominations (she was nominated against Sandi in two of the three) and was finally evicted in a head to head eviction against Sandi on day 42.

EITyeb
Eityeb Gruden is a 26-year-old from Koper, Slovenia. During his stay in the Big brother house Eityeb was only nominated once for eviction. On day 35 Eityebs girlfriend Mateja entered the house as a new housemate. The one time that Eityeb was nominated he was nominated against Mateja and evicted with 64 percent of the vote.

Second Batch
The following housemates entered the house on Day 35.

Mateja
Mateja is a 23-year-old from Šmartno ob Paki, Slovenia. Mateja entered the house on day 35 as a new housemate along with Saša. Upon her entrance into the house it was revealed that she was Eityebs girlfriend. Mateja found herself nominated several times while in the house and eventually found herself nominated for eviction head to head against Eityeb, which she survived. Mateja was the only non original housemate to do fairly well ultimately coming in third place.

Saša
Saša is a 28-year-old from Šentjanž who entered the house as a new housemate along with Mateja on day 35. Saša was the sixth evictee and left the house on day 49.

Third Batch
The following housemates entered the house on Day 49.

Nejc
Nejc is a 21-year-old who entered the house on day 49 as a new housemate, along with Tea. Nejc was the tenth evictee and left the house on day 77.

Tea
Tea is a 22-year-old who entered the house on day 49 as a new housemate, along with Nejc. Tea was the eighth evictee and left the house on day 64.

Nominations table

 Housemates living on the rich side of the house
 Housemates living on the poor side of the house
 Automatically nominated due to rule breaking

In week one Marko was fake evicted to the rich side of the house. Soon after he had to choose six other housemates to join him on the rich side of the house. The housemates he chose were Dada, Eityeb, Jeanine, Marcelo, Sandi, and Sara.   
In weeks two through seven and week nine housemates could only nominate other housemates living on the same side of the house as them.
In week seven both Naske and Sebastijan were put up for eviction by big brother for rule breaking.
In week eight housemates could only nominate housemates living on the other side of the house.
In week ten the two sides of the house merged and housemates could nominate any other housemate.
In week eleven both Naske and Sara were put up for eviction by big brother for rule breaking.
In week twelve Marcelo was put up for eviction by big brother for rule breaking.
In week thirteen the public voted for the housemate they wanted to see win.

House Divide

 Housemates living on the rich side of the house
 Housemates living on the poor side of the house

References

External links 
 Big Brother Slovenia website
 Big Brother Slovenia website

2008 Slovenian television seasons
Slovenia